Dubrovsky is a rural locality (a khutor) in Iskrinskoye Rural Settlement, Uryupinsky District, Volgograd Oblast, Russia. The population was 103 as of 2010.

Geography 
Dubrovsky is located in steppe, 44 km west of Uryupinsk (the district's administrative centre) by road. Rozovsky is the nearest rural locality.

References 

Rural localities in Uryupinsky District